There have been 108 women in the Victorian Legislative Assembly since its establishment in 1856. Women have had the right to vote in Victoria, Australia since 1908 and the right to stand as a candidate for the Victorian Legislative Assembly since 1923.

The first successful female candidate for the Legislative Assembly was Millie Peacock, who was elected as a United Australia Party member for Allandale in a by-election in 1933, but she retired in 1935, stating that Parliament was "no place for a woman". Ivy Weber was the first woman to win a seat at a general election, winning Nunawading as an independent in 1937 (she was also the first female independent elected in Australia). She was joined in 1938 by Fanny Brownbill, Labor's first female member, elected at a by-election for the seat of Geelong. Weber resigned in 1943 and Brownbill died in 1948, after which there were no women in the Assembly until 1967, when Dorothy Goble was elected as the Liberal member for Mitcham. Since then there have continuously been female members in the Assembly.

The first female minister was Labor's Pauline Toner, who became a minister in 1982. Since then, the number of female members has continued to rise. Jeanette Powell was the first National Party member, elected to the Assembly in 2002. That election also brought 11 new Labor women into the Assembly. Since Ivy Weber, three other women, Susan Davies Suzanna Sheed and Ali Cupper have been elected to the Assembly as independents. Ellen Sandell was one of the two Greens candidates first elected to the Assembly at the 2014 state election.

Judy Maddigan became the first female Speaker in 2003. Since then, three other women, Jenny Lindell Christine Fyffe and Maree Edwards have served as Speaker. Maree Edwards has been the Speaker since 2022 and is the first female Speaker from a regional city electorate.

List of women in the Victorian Legislative Assembly 
Names in bold indicate women who have been appointed as Ministers or Parliamentary Secretaries during their time in Parliament. Names in italics indicate women who were first elected at a by-election, and * symbolises members that have sat as members in both the Legislative Assembly and the Legislative Council.

Timeline

Proportion of women in the Assembly 
Numbers and proportions are as they were directly after the relevant election and do not take into account by-elections, defections or other changes in membership. The Liberal column also includes that party's predecessor, the United Australia and Liberal & Country parties.

See also 

 
 
Victoria